The ninth season of the American sitcom The Big Bang Theory premiered on CBS on Monday, September 21, 2015. The series returned to its regular Thursday night time slot on November 5, 2015 beginning with the season's seventh episode. The season concluded on May 12, 2016. On March 12, 2014, The Big Bang Theory was renewed for an additional three years, extending it through the 2016–17 television season for a total of ten seasons. Laura Spencer was promoted to the main cast during this season after being a recurring cast member for two seasons.

Production 
Like the previous season, the first six episodes of the ninth season aired on a different night due to CBS acquiring the rights to Thursday Night Football games. In May 2015, CBS announced at its annual upfront presentation, that the series would begin its ninth season on Mondays, before returning to the Thursday slot once the football games ended.

Filming for the ninth season began on August 5, 2015, according to posts on Twitter by several of the cast members including Melissa Rauch and Kunal Nayyar.

Laurie Metcalf reprised her role as Sheldon's mother Mary in episodes 1 and 24, and Keith Carradine returned as Penny's father Wyatt in episode 3.

Sheldon's maternal grandmother Constance, whom he calls "Meemaw", made her first long-awaited appearance in episode 14 and was portrayed by June Squibb and Leonard's father Alfred also made his first long-awaited appearance in episode 24 and was played by Judd Hirsch.

This was the first season to feature every main cast member of the show, including former main cast member Sara Gilbert, who made a guest appearance in the 200th episode.

Cast

Main cast
 Johnny Galecki as Dr. Leonard Hofstadter
 Jim Parsons as Dr. Sheldon Cooper
 Kaley Cuoco as Penny
 Simon Helberg as Howard Wolowitz
 Kunal Nayyar as Dr. Rajesh "Raj" Koothrappali
 Mayim Bialik as Dr. Amy Farrah Fowler
 Melissa Rauch as Dr. Bernadette Rostenkowski-Wolowitz
 Kevin Sussman as Stuart David Bloom
 Laura Spencer as Dr. Emily Sweeney

Recurring cast
 Laurie Metcalf as Mary Cooper
 John Ross Bowie as Dr. Barry Kripke
 Wil Wheaton as himself
 Casey Sander as Mike Rostenkowski
 Alessandra Torresani as Claire
 Christine Baranski as Dr. Beverly Hofstadter
 Brian Thomas Smith as Zach Johnson 
 Sara Gilbert as Leslie Winkle
 Bob Newhart as Dr. Arthur Jeffries/Professor Proton
 Stephen Hawking as himself

Guest cast
 Jim Meskimen as a Minister
 Melissa Tang as Mandy Chao
 Keith Carradine as Wyatt (Penny's dad)
 Megan Heyn as Natalie
 Patrika Darbo as Grace
 Michael Rapaport as Kenny
 Adam Nimoy as himself
 Stephen Merchant as Dave Gibbs
 Lio Tipton as Vanessa Bennett
 Elon Musk as himself
 Wayne Wilderson as Travis
 Jane Kaczmarek as Dr. Gallo
 June Squibb as Meemaw
 Creagen Dow as Maitre D'
 Adam West as himself
 Blake Anderson as Trevor
 Judd Hirsch as Alfred Hofstadter
 Stan Lee as himself
 Amanda Payton as Ainsley

Episodes

Ratings

Reception 
The ninth season received mixed reviews. John Doyle of The Globe and Mail criticized the humor, writing that "The show isn't funny any more. The same tired jokes go around in circles. It's dated and stale", while Tom Eames of Digital Spy criticized the relationship between characters Leonard and Penny, writing that they "certainly don't have some passionate, Ross and Rachel-style 'will they / won't they' romance, with fans dying to see them together. Even now they're married, it's a weirdly anti-climactic payoff - and it doesn't quite feel right that they're together." Ashley Bissette Sumerel of TV Fanatic wrote that "For a rather serious season premiere, "The Matrimonial Momentum" is still a lot of fun".

Notes

References 

General references

External links 

2015 American television seasons
2016 American television seasons
The Big Bang Theory seasons